The following is a list of populist parties, leaders and movements.

Africa

Burundi 

 Pierre Nkurunziza

Cameroon 

 Paul Biya

Egypt 

 Gamal Abdel Nasser
 Abdel Fattah el-Sisi

Equatorial Guinea 

 Teodoro Obiang Nguema Mbasogo

Gabon 

 Ali Bongo Ondimba

The Gambia 

 Yahya Jammeh

Kenya 

 Raila Odinga

Liberia 

 George Weah

Libya 

 Muammar Gaddafi

Rwanda 

 Paul Kagame

South Africa 

Economic Freedom Fighters
Freedom Front Plus
Jacob Zuma

Sudan 

 Omar al-Bashir

Tanzania 
 John Magufuli

Tunisia 
 Kais Saied
 Heart of Tunisia

Uganda 

 Idi Amin
 Yoweri Museveni

Zambia 

 Michael Sata

Zimbabwe 

 ZANU-PF

Americas

Argentina

 Juan Perón (1946-1955) (1973-1974) 
 Isabel Perón (1974-1976)
 Antonio Cafiero (1983-1989)
 Carlos Menem (1989-1999)
 Eduardo Duhalde (1999-2003)
 Néstor Kirchner (2003-2010)
 Cristina Fernández de Kirchner (2007–present)
 Mauricio Macri (2015-2019)
 Alberto Fernández (2019–present)

Bolivia
 Evo Morales (2006-2019)

Brazil
 Getulio Vargas (1930-1945) (1951-1954)
 Fernando Collor de Mello (1990-1992)
 Luiz Inácio Lula da Silva (2003-2010, 2023–present)
 Dilma Rousseff (2011-2016)
 Jair Bolsonaro (2019–2023)

Canada
 Preston Manning (1997-2000)
 Niki Ashton (2008–present)
 Maxime Bernier (2018–present)
 Doug Ford (2018–present)
 Kevin O'Leary
 Ralph Klein
 Justin Trudeau (2013-present)
 Pierre Poilievre (2022–present)

Chile 
 Carlos Ibáñez del Campo (1927-1931) (1952-1958)
 Pedro Aguirre Cerda (1938-1941)
 Francisco Javier Errázuriz Talavera
 Joaquín Lavín
 Marco Enríquez-Ominami
 Carlos Bianchi Chelech
 Daniel Jadue
 Franco Parisi
 José Antonio Kast
 Pamela Jiles
 Frente Amplio
 The List of the People
 Party of the People

Colombia 

 Gustavo Rojas Pinilla (1953-1957)
 Álvaro Uribe (2002-2010)
 Rodolfo Hernández Suárez

Cuba 

 Fidel Castro (1959-2008)

Ecuador 
 José María Velasco Ibarra (1934-1935) (1944-1947) (1952-1956) (1960-1961) (1968-1972)
 Abdalá Bucaram (1996-1997)
 Lucio Gutiérrez (2003-2005)
 Rafael Correa (2007-2017)
 Abdalá Bucaram Jr. (2009-2014)

El Salvador 

 FMLN
 Nuevas Ideas
 Nayib Bukele (2012–present)

Guatemala
 Jimmy Morales (2016-2020)
 Guatemalan National Revolutionary Unity

Honduras
 Manuel Zelaya (2006-2009)
 Juan Orlando Hernandez

Mexico
 Andrés Manuel López Obrador (2018–present)

Nicaragua
 Daniel Ortega (1979-1990) (2007–present)

Paraguay 

 Fernando Lugo (2008-2012)

Peru
 Manuel A. Odría (1950-1956)
 Juan Velasco Alvarado (1968-1975)
 Alan García (1985-1990) (2006-2011)
 Alberto Fujimori (1990-2000)
 Pedro Castillo
 Keiko Fujimori
 Popular Force
 Rafael López Aliaga

United States
 Alex Jones, radio show host (1999–present)
 Andrew Jackson, 7th President (1824-1837)
 James K. Polk, 11th President (1845-1849)
 Peter Cooper (1840-1876)
 Benjamin Butler (1859-1884)
 Leonidas L. Polk (1865-1892)
 Free Silver Movement (1873-1963)
 Greenback Party (1874-1889)
 John Rankin Rogers (1876-1900)
 The Farmers' Alliance (1880-1890)
 James B. Weaver (1880-1908)
 Samuel Williams (1882-1908)
 Theodore Roosevelt, 26th President (1882-1912)
 Charles Macune (1886-1992)
 Ignatius L. Donnelly (1887-1900)
 Marion Butler (1888-1900)
 James G. Field (1892-1900)
 People's Party (1892-1909)
 Silver Party (1892-1911)
 Thomas E. Watson (1892-1920)
 Silver Republican Party (1896-1901)
William Jennings Bryan (1896-1908)
 Wharton Barker (1896-1912)
 Thomas Tibbles (1904)
 William Lemke (1921-1950)
 Huey Long (1932-1935)
 Union Party (1935-1936)
George Wallace (1962-1976)
Edwin Edwards (1964-1996)
 Rush Limbaugh (1967-2021)
 Mike Gravel (1969-1981)
 Ron Paul (1976-1977, 1979–1985, 1997–2013)
 New Alliance Party (1979-1993)
 Mo Brooks (1982–present)
 Tom McClintock (1982–present)
 Bob Richards (1984)
Populist Party (1984-1996)
 Pat Buchanan (1985-2000)
 David Duke (1989-1992)
 Bernie Sanders (1991–present)
 Jesse Jackson (1991-1997)
 Bo Gritz (1992)
Ross Perot (1992-1996)
 Roy Moore (1992–present)
 Joe Arpaio (1993–2017)
 Reform Party (1995–present)
 Jim Jordan (1995–present)
 Greg Abbott (1996–present)
 Dennis Kucinich (1997-2013)
 Steve King (1997-2021)
 Andy Harris (1999–present)
 Andy Biggs (2001–present)
 Ted Cruz (2003–present)
 Tim Ryan
 Louie Gohmert (2005–present)
 John Fetterman (2006–present)
 Sarah Palin (2006–present)
 Tea Party movement
 Matt Gaetz (2010–present)
 Paul Gosar (2011–present)
 Ron Johnson (2011–present)
 Josh Mandel (2011–present)
 Allen West (2011–present)
 Tulsi Gabbard (2013–present)
 Scott Perry (2013–present)
 Kelli Ward (2013–present)
Elizabeth Warren (2013–present)
 Steve Bannon (2013–present) 
 Donald Trump, 45th President (2015–present)
 Donald Trump Jr. (2015–2021)
 House Freedom Caucus (2015–present)
 Corey Lewandowski (2015–present)
 Jody Hice (2015–present)
 Warren Davidson (2015–present)
 Amanda Chase (2016–present)
 Peter Navarro (2017–present)
 Stephen Miller (2017–present)
 Mark Meadows (2017–present)
 Sebastian Gorka (2017–present)
 Josh Hawley (2018–present)
 Ron DeSantis (2018–present)
 Alexandria Ocasio-Cortez (2018–present)
 Ilhan Omar (2018–present)
 Ayanna Pressley (2018–present)
 Rashida Tlaib (2018–present)
 Marjorie Taylor Greene (2020–present)
 Lauren Boebert (2020–present)
 Marry Miller (2020–present)
 Matt Rosendale (2020–present)
 Yvette Herrell (2020–present)
 Jamaal Bowman (2020–present)
 Cori Bush (2020–present)
 Madison Cawthorn (2020–present)
 Robert Barnes (attorney) (2020–present)
 J. D. Vance (2021–present)
 Andrew Yang
 Ralph Nader
 Green Party of the United States
 Justice Democrats
 Occupy movement
 The Squad

Venezuela

 Rafael Caldera (1994-1999)
Hugo Chavez (1999-2013)
Nicolás Maduro (2013–present)

Asia

Bangladesh 
 Sheikh Hasina

Mainland China 
 Xi Jinping

Hong Kong 
 Civic Passion
 League of Social Democrats
 People Power

India 
 Narendra Modi
 Indira Gandhi
 Shiv Sena
 Samajwadi Party
 Aam Aadmi Party

Indonesia 
 Joko Widodo
 Great Indonesia Movement Party
 Indonesian Democratic Party of Struggle
 Democratic Party
 Prosperous Justice Party

Iran 
 Mahmoud Ahmadinejad
People's Mujahedin of Iran

Israel
Benjamin Netanyahu

Japan 
 Shinzo Abe
 Tōru Hashimoto
 Shintaro Ishihara
 Yuriko Koike
 Junichiro Koizumi
 Tarō Yamamoto

Malaysia 
 Anwar Ibrahim
 Mahathir Mohamad
 Syed Saddiq

Myanmar
 National League for Democracy

Pakistan
 Zulfikar Ali Bhutto
 Benazir Bhutto
 Imran Khan and Pakistan Tehreek-e-Insaf

Philippines
Rodrigo Duterte
Joseph Estrada
 Bongbong Marcos

South Korea 
 Chun Doo-hwan
 Kim Dae-jung
 Lee Jae-myung
 Park Chung-hee
 Yoon Suk-yeol

Sri Lanka 
 Mahinda Rajapaksa

Taiwan 
 Chen Shui-bian
 Han Kuo-yu
 Tsai Ing-wen
 Terry Gou

Thailand 
 Thaksin Shinawatra
 Yingluck Shinawatra

Turkey 
 Recep Tayyip Erdoğan
 Justice and Development Party
 Peoples' Democratic Party
 Nationalist Movement Party

Europe

Austria
 Freedom Party of Austria
 JETZT
Alliance for the Future of Austria

Belarus 

 Alexander Lukashenko

Belgium
 Vlaams Belang
National Front
 Workers' Party of Belgium

Bosnia and Herzegovina

 Milorad Dodik
 Alliance of Independent Social Democrats

Bulgaria 

Attack
Boyko Borisov
GERB
Bulgarian Socialist Party
Reload Bulgaria
National Front for the Salvation of Bulgaria
National Movement for Stability and Progress
There Is Such a People

Croatia 

 Croatian Democratic Alliance of Slavonia and Baranja
 Croatian Party of Rights
 Croatian Party of Rights 1861
 Croatian Party of Rights Dr. Ante Starčević
 Croatian Peasant Party
 Croatian Democratic Peasant Party
 Human Shield

Czechia 

 Freedom and Direct Democracy
Tomio Okamura
Andrej Babiš
ANO 2011
Miloš Zeman
Communist Party of Bohemia and Moravia
Tricolour Citizens' Movement
Oath

Denmark
 Danish People's Party
 Red-Green Alliance
 The New Right

Estonia
 Conservative People's Party of Estonia

France
 La France Insoumise
 Marine Le Pen
National Rally
Reconquête
Debout la France
Movement for France
 Pierre Poujade, founder of Poujadism.
 Yellow vests movement
 Eric Ciotti

Finland
Finns Party

Georgia 
 Alliance of Patriots of Georgia
 Mikheil Saakashvili

Germany

 Jannes Bock
 Yusuf Kaplanci
 Alternative for Germany
National Democratic Party of Germany
The Left

Greece 

Golden Dawn
Alexis Tsipras
Syriza
Independent Greeks
Popular Orthodox Rally
Greek Solution

Hungary 

 Fidesz
Viktor Orbán
 Our Homeland Movement

Iceland

 People's Party
 Pirate Party
 Centre Party

Ireland

 Sinn Féin
 Socialist Party
 People Before Profit

Italy

 Berlusconism
 Silvio Berlusconi
Brothers of Italy
 The Five Star Movement
 League
 New Force
 CasaPound
 Communist Refoundation Party
 Potere al Popolo

Latvia 

 For Latvia from the Heart
 Latvian Association of Regions
 For a Humane Latvia
 Law and Order
 Aldis Gobzems
 Artuss Kaimiņš

Lithuania 

 Labour Party

Luxembourg 

 Alternative Democratic Reform Party

Moldova

 Șor Party

Montenegro

 Milo Đukanović
 Democratic Party of Socialists of Montenegro
 New Serb Democracy
 Movement for Changes
 Democratic People's Party
 True Montenegro

Netherlands 
Geert Wilders
Party for Freedom
Forum for Democracy
JA21
Reformed Political Party
Socialist Party

North Macedonia 

 Nikola Gruevski
 VMRO-DPMNE

Norway 

 Progress Party
 Red Party

Poland 

Law and Justice
Confederation Liberty and Independence
Kukiz'15
Real Politics Union

Portugal
Chega
Bloco de Esquerda
Portuguese Communist Party

Romania 

 Traian Băsescu
People's Party – Dan Diaconescu
Poporanism
Liviu Dragnea
Social Democratic Party
Romanian Socialist Party
Alliance for the Union of Romanians

Russia
 Narodniks
Vladimir Putin
Vladimir Zhirinovsky

Serbia 
 Aleksandar Vučić
 Slobodan Milošević
 Ivica Dačić
 Dveri
 Serbian Progressive Party
 Socialist Party of Serbia
 Serbian Radical Party
 New Democratic Party of Serbia
 United Serbia
 Do not let Belgrade drown
 Strength of Serbia Movement
 Serbian People's Party
 Enough is Enough
 New Serbia
 Serbian Renewal Movement (formerly)
 Serbian Patriotic Alliance (defunct)
 Yugoslav Left (defunct)

Spain
 Podemos
Vox
United Left
Together for Catalonia

Slovakia 

Robert Fico
Direction - Slovak Social Democracy
Slovak National Party
Vladimír Mečiar
Kotleba - People's Party Our Slovakia
Republic
We Are Family
Ordinary People and Independent Personalities
Peter Pellegrini

Slovenia 

 Slovenian Democratic Party
 Slovenian National Party
 The Left

Sweden
 Sweden Democrats
 Alternative for Sweden
 Left Party

Switzerland

 Federal Democratic Union of Switzerland
Swiss People's Party
Ticino League
Geneva Citizens' Movement
 Swiss Party of Labour

Ukraine
 Communist Party of Ukraine
 Svoboda
 Radical Party of Oleh Liashko
 Volodymyr Zelensky

United Kingdom
 Reform UK
British National Party
 Nigel Farage
 Democratic Unionist Party
 Respect Party
 Scottish Socialist Party
 Jeremy Corbyn
 Boris Johnson
UK Independence Party

Oceania

Australia
 Pauline Hanson's One Nation
 Pauline Hanson
 United Australia Party
 Jacqui Lambie Network
 Katter's Australian Party
 John Curtin
 Gough Whitlam
 Australian Greens
 Matthew Guy (2014-2018, 2021–present)

New Zealand
 New Zealand First
 Robert Muldoon (1921-1992)

See also 
 Populism

References